"Dans l'espace" is a song by French rapper Gambi featuring Heuss l'Enfoiré. It was released on 17 January 2020, and topped the singles chart in France.

Charts

Weekly charts

Year-end charts

Certifications

References

2020 singles
2020 songs
French-language songs
French hip hop songs
Number-one singles in France